Corispermum is a genus of plants in the family Amaranthaceae. Common names given to members of the genus involve bugseed, tickseed, and tumbleweed. In general, these are erect annual plants with flat, thin leaves and topped with inflorescences of flowers with long bracts. Bugseeds are native to North America and Eurasia, but little is known about their taxonomy and distribution.

Species include:
Corispermum americanum - American bugseed
Corispermum hyssopifolium - tumbleweed, tumble-weed;  this species forms a tumbleweed
Corispermum ochotense - Russian bugseed
Corispermum pallasii - Siberian bugseed
Corispermum ulopterum

References

External links
Jepson Manual Treatment
USDA Plants Profile
Flora of North America

Amaranthaceae
Tumbleweeds
Amaranthaceae genera